Wolters Kluwer ELM Solutions is a computer software company that provides enterprise legal management software and services designed for legal departments.  ELM Solutions is a component of Wolters Kluwer, a global information services company.

According to a 2008 ILTA survey of 460 legal billing professionals, 27.96% of respondents reported using a Wolters Kluwer ELM Solutions program (AIMS or ShareDocs) for electronic billing. ELM Solutions offerings are integrated into the Passport legal management suite, offered under the ELM Solutions brand.

History
1998 – Datacert was founded in Houston, Texas, by Eric Elfman. The company’s original product was an online document exchange where law firms would submit bills to corporate legal departments electronically.

2001 – Datacert acquired DigiContract, adding online document collaboration to its service offering portfolio.

2004 – Datacert was named one of the fastest growing private companies in the United States, placing No. 194 on the Inc. 500 list.

2005 – Datacert Europe Ltd. opened its headquarters in London.

2007 – Additional European offices were opened in Paris and Frankfurt. The company acquired Corprasoft, a matter management company

2008 – James Tallman was appointed President & CEO.

2009 – Datacert Europe expanded its presence with a new office in Basel, Switzerland.

2010 – Datacert opened offices in Toronto and acquired a software development and professional services center from Symcon Global Technologies, resulting in an additional office in Chennai, India.  Datacert also launched its patent-pending technology platform, PassportTM.

2011 – Passport experiences industry adoption securing, among others, Fortune/Global Fortune No. 1, Walmart, as a platform client.

2014 – Datacert was acquired by Wolters Kluwer and merged with its Tymetrix subsidiary to create a new group ELM Solutions.

Offices
ELM Solutions is headquartered in Houston, Texas, and operates corporate offices throughout North America, EMEA, and APAC. The company’s EMEA headquarters are in London with three more European offices in Basel, Paris, and Frankfurt.  ELM Solution’s APAC office is located in Chennai, India

References

External links 
 Metrocorpcounsel.com

See also
 Enterprise Software
 Legal Matter Management
 Early Case Assessment
 Risk Management
 Regulatory compliance
 Comparative
 Contract
 Business Intelligence
 Legal hold
 E-billing
 Independent software vendor

Companies based in Houston